The 1992 Copa Libertadores was the 33rd edition of the Copa Libertadores, CONMEBOL's annual international club tournament. São Paulo won the competition.

The participating teams were divided into five groups, in which teams of the same country were placed in the same group. Each country was represented by two teams. The countries were paired as follows:

Group 1:  Argentina and  Chile 
Group 2:  Bolivia and  Brazil 
Group 3:  Ecuador and  Venezuela
Group 4:  Colombia and  Peru
Group 5:  Paraguay and  Uruguay.

Group stage

Group 1 
Colo-Colo, as the previous year champions, should join the competition only in the Round of 16, but they requested to start the competition in the group stage, due to financial reasons, thus five clubs participated in this group.

Group 2

Group 3 

 As Marítimo and Universidad de Los Andes finished with the same number of points, a playoff to define the third-placed team was played. Marítimo beat Universidad de Los Andes and qualified to the Round of 16.

 third-place playoff

Group 4

Group 5

Knockout stage

Finals

First leg

Second leg

References

1
Copa Libertadores seasons